The Anniston Star is the daily newspaper serving Anniston, Alabama, and the surrounding six-county region. Average Sunday circulation in September 2004 was 26,747. However, by 2020 it was approximately half of this. The newspaper is locally owned by Consolidated Publishing Company, which is controlled by the Ayers family of Anniston. As of 2020, the paper operated as a "digital-first" publication, and was putting out only three print editions each week.

History

The paper was first published in 1883 as the Anniston Evening Star. It traces its modern history to 1911, when managing editor Col. Harry M. Ayers left to start his own paper, the Anniston Hot Blast—a nod to Anniston's roots as a steel town. By 1912, the Hot Blast had become Anniston's largest newspaper, and was more than large enough to absorb the Evening Star. Although the merged paper was initially called the Anniston Hot Blast and Evening Star, the Hot Blast name was eventually dropped. The Star has been owned by the Ayers family since 1911.

Early on, the Star gained a reputation as one of the few liberal-minded Southern newspapers.  It was one of the few progressive Southern papers to support Franklin D. Roosevelt during all four of his election campaigns. In 1948, it broke with the Dixiecrats, who had taken over the Democratic machinery in Alabama, and supported Harry Truman for president.

H. Brandt Ayers took over the paper from his father in 1965. Under the younger Ayers' watch, the Star reversed its initial skepticism toward the Civil Rights Movement and strongly supported school integration, one of the few Southern papers to do so. George Wallace derisively nicknamed the paper The Red Star for its support of integration.  It has consistently remained one of the more liberal newspapers in a state that has grown increasingly friendly to Republicans.

The Star is Consolidated's flagship paper. Other newspapers printed by the company include The Daily Home, and the weeklies The Cleburne News, the St. Clair Times, and the News Journal.

The Star is a community newspaper and the dominant source of retail advertising in the region. Its online edition offers the content of the print edition, along with syndicated articles from Consolidated's network papers.

During the COVID-19 pandemic, Anthony Cook, head of the Star's publishing company, announced that the editorial page was to be discontinued. Cook also voluntarily furloughed himself rather than laying off staff.

H. Brandt Ayers controversy
On January 2, 2018, during the Me Too movement, former publisher H. Brandt Ayers admitted that he assaulted Wendy Sigal in her Anniston home in the 1970s. Wendy Sigal was a reporter who worked at the newspaper in 1973 and 1974. He admitted he spanked her, but it was with advice of a doctor. Veronica Pike Kennedy claimed that Ayers spanked her in the Star's newsroom in 1975 and Ayers seemed to confirm it.

In March 2019 H. Brandt Ayers resigned as head of Consolidated Publishing after further alleged incidents of misconduct on his part emerged, including further alleged incidents of physical abuse of female staff. He was replaced by his wife, Josephine Ayers. H. Brandt Ayers died in May 2020.

References

External links
 
 
 

Newspapers published in Alabama
Anniston, Alabama
Newspapers established in 1883
Daily newspapers published in the United States
1883 establishments in Alabama